Tribromosilane is the chemical compound with the formula Br3Si.  At high temperatures, it decomposes to produce silicon, and is an alternative to purified trichlorosilane of ultrapure silicon in the semiconductor industry.  

The Schumacher Process of silicon deposition uses tribromosilane gas to produce polysilicon, but it has a number of cost and safety advantages over the Siemens Process to make polysilicon.

It may be prepared by heating crystalline silicon with gaseous hydrogen bromide at high temperature. It spontaneously combusts when exposed to air.

References

Silanes
Bromides
Nonmetal halides